Cyperus victoriensis, also known as channel nut grass is a sedge of the family Cyperaceae that is native to all the states and territories of mainland Australia.

Description

The simple inflorescence has three to eight primary branches with a length of about  that is often bent under the weight of the spikelets. The spikelets are flattened with 3 to 15 on each spike containing around 40 flowers.

Taxonomy
The species was first formally described by the botanist Charles Baron Clarke in 1908 in the Bulletin of Miscellaneous Information, Royal Gardens, Kew.

Distribution
It is endemic to mainland Australia and is found in all states. In Western Australia and is found along streams and creeks in the Kimberley region where it grows in sandy-clay soils.
In New South Wales it is widespread through most non-coastal areas and is known on floodplains and the banks of inland watercourses mostly on clayey soils. It is found in north western Victoria from the mallee through to the Riverina.

See also
List of Cyperus species

References

Taxa named by Charles Baron Clarke
Plants described in 1908
Flora of Western Australia
victoriensis
Flora of New South Wales
Flora of Victoria (Australia)
Flora of Queensland
Flora of South Australia
Flora of the Northern Territory